Jérôme Clavier (born 3 May 1983 in Chambray-lès-Tours) is a French pole vaulter.

Biography
He finished sixth at the 2002 World Junior Championships, seventh at the 2003 Summer Universiade and sixth at the 2007 European Indoor Championships. He competed at the World Indoor Championships in 2004 and 2006 without reaching the finals.

His personal best is 5.75 metres, achieved on 9 July 2008 in Karlsruhe. He has a better indoor result with 5.85 m,21 January 2011  Villeurbanne.

Competition record

See also
 French all-time top lists - Pole vault

References

External links

1983 births
Living people
French male pole vaulters
Olympic athletes of France
Athletes (track and field) at the 2008 Summer Olympics
People from Chambray-lès-Tours
Sportspeople from Indre-et-Loire
Mediterranean Games bronze medalists for France
Mediterranean Games medalists in athletics
Athletes (track and field) at the 2005 Mediterranean Games
20th-century French people
21st-century French people